Tripti Dimri (born 23 February 1994) is an Indian actress who predominantly works in Hindi films. She made her acting debut in the comedy film Poster Boys (2017) and had her first lead role in the romantic drama Laila Majnu (2018). Dimri earned critical acclaim for her starring roles in Anvita Dutt's period films Bulbbul (2020) and Qala (2022). She was featured in Forbes Asia 30 Under 30 list of 2021.

Career
Dimri made her acting debut with Shreyas Talpade's directorial debut, the 2017 comedy Poster Boys, starring Sunny Deol and Bobby Deol and Talpade in lead roles. An official remake of the Marathi film Poshter Boyz, it featured her as Talpade's love interest. Dimri next appeared in a leading role in Imtiaz Ali's 2018 Romantic drama Laila Majnu, opposite Avinash Tiwary. In her review for Firstpost, Anna M. M. Vetticad noted that she "imbue[d] her Laila with an edge that made the character's constant flirtations with danger believable".

Dimri achieved her breakthrough as the protagonist in Anvita Dutt's 2020 supernatural thriller Bulbbul, also starring Rahul Bose, Paoli Dam, Avinash Tiwary and Parambrata Chatterjee. Produced by Anushka Sharma, the film opened to positive reception from critics and the audience with particular praise for its stand on feminism, and performance of the leads, especially Dimri. Namrata Joshi of The Hindu wrote, "From the vulnerable and the innocent to the transformation into the mysterious tease, Dimri is a stunner who speaks volumes with her eyes. And the audience can do little but stay enraptured." Her performance earned her the Filmfare OTT Award for Best Actress in a web original film.

Dimri next reunited with the team of Bulbbul for their next home production Qala. The film received positive reviews from critics and audiences for the performances, direction, screenplay, cinematography, production design and visual style. Dimri's performance was highly praised with many critics hailing the performance as one of the finest in 2022. She has started filming for director Anand Tiwari's yet untitled film co-starring Vicky Kaushal in March 2022. She will also star in Sandeep Reddy Vanga's Animal alongside Ranbir Kapoor.

In the media 
Dimri was featured by Forbes Asia in their 30 Under 30 list of 2021. She ranked 8th in Rediff.com's list of Bollywood Best Actresses of 2020. She ranked 20th in The Times of India's 50 Most Desirable Women List of 2020.

Filmography

Films

Awards

References

External links 
 
 

Indian film actresses
Living people
Place of birth missing (living people)
1994 births